Hamza Karimov (born 10 December 1980) is an Uzbekistani association footballer currently playing for FC Andijon in the Uzbek League. Karimov has also represented Uzbekistan at full senior level.

Career
Karimov is a seasoned Uzbek League defender, having represented 4 clubs. In 2015, he scored his first Asian Champions League goal against Iranian club Tractor Sazi F.C. in a 2–1 win.

International career
Karimov has represented Uzbekistan on 7 occasions, with his debut coming in 2007 in a friendly game against Ukraine which they lost 2–1.

References

External links
 
 
 

1980 births
Living people
Uzbekistani footballers
Uzbekistan international footballers
Association football defenders
Association football midfielders